Fundella pellucens, the Caribbean pod borer, is a species of snout moth in the genus Fundella. It was described by Zeller in 1848.

Description

Its forewings are dark grey and its hindwings are creamy white with darker margins.

The entire larva ranges in color from yellowish-white to brown.

The pupa ranges in color from yellowish-brown to reddish-brown.

Range

It is found in Florida, Barbados, Haiti, Cuba, Montserrat, the Virgin Islands, Puerto Rico, Brazil, and Bolivia.

Ecology

Host Plants

The larvae feed on a wide range of plants, including Vigna luteola, Canavalia ensiformis, Canavalia maritima, Cajan cajan, Phaseolus species (including Phaseolus lunatus) and Cassia occidentalis. Young larvae may initially feed on the flowers and continue feeding on immature legumes when they get older. There is also evidence that larvae may complete their entire development on the legumes only. They bore into the pods of their host plant and feed on the seeds. At times, legumes may be bound together with silk to form a shelter. Pupation takes place in the soil within a silk cocoon.

References

Moths described in 1848
Phycitinae